Han Lee (born September 2, 1977) is a Korean-American professional golfer.

Lee was born in Seoul, South Korea.

Lee played college golf at the University of California, Berkeley. He won the Canadian Amateur in 1999 and 2000.

Lee turned professional in 2000. He played on the Nationwide Tour from 2002 to 2004. He played on the Asian Tour in 2007 and 2008. He has played on the Japan Golf Tour since 2008. He has one victory, the 2012 Mynavi ABC Championship and has also twice tied for second, at the 2009 Canon Open and the 2009 Mitsui Sumitomo VISA Taiheiyo Masters.

Amateur wins
1999 Canadian Amateur
2000 Canadian Amateur

Professional wins (2)

Japan Golf Tour wins (1)

Asian Development Tour wins (1)

1Co-sanctioned by the Professional Golf of Malaysia Tour

Results in World Golf Championships

"T" = Tied

References

External links

American male golfers
California Golden Bears men's golfers
PGA Tour golfers
Asian Tour golfers
Japan Golf Tour golfers
Golfers from California
American sportspeople of Korean descent
South Korean emigrants to the United States
Golfers from Seoul
Sportspeople from Fullerton, California
1977 births
Living people